Asansol Sadar subdivision is an administrative subdivision of the Paschim Bardhaman district in the state of West Bengal, India.

Overview
Asansol Sadar subdivision is part of the Ajay Damodar Barakar tract. This area is sort of an extension of the Chota Nagpur Plateau. It is a rocky undulating area with laterite soil, with the Ajay on the north, the Damodar on the south and the Barakar on the west. For ages the area was heavily forested and infested with plunderers and marauders. The discovery of coal in the 18th century led to industrialisation of the area and most of the forests have been cleared. Maithon Dam of Damodar Valley Corporation, located in Jharkhand, is on the border of this subdivision.

Subdivisions
Paschim Bardhaman district is divided into the following two administrative subdivisions:

Note:Before bifurcation of the erstwhile Bardhaman district Galsi I was in Durgapur subdivision, but after bifurcation it is in Bardhman Sadar North subdivision.

Administrative units
Asansol subdivision has 10 police stations, 4 community development blocks, 4 panchayat samitis, 35 gram panchayats, 181 mouzas, 165 inhabited villages, 1 municipal corporation, 3 municipalities and 26 census towns+1 (partly). The single municipal corporation is at Asansol. The municipalities are at: Raniganj, Jamuria and Kulti. The census towns are: Chittaranjan, Hindustan Cables Town, Panuria, Domohani, Bhanowara, Majiara, Pangachhiya, Kunustara, Topsi, Nimsa, Chinchuria, Kenda, Parasia, Ratibati, Chapui, Jemari (J.K. Nagar Township), Banshra, Belebathan, Chelad, Murgathaul, Amkula, Baktarnagar, Egara, Sahebganj, Raghunathchak, Ballavpur and Kendra Khottamdi (partly). It also includes Charanpur, an outgrowth of Jamuria. The subdivision has its headquarters at Asansol.

According to the Kolkata Gazette notification of 3 June 2015, the municipal areas of Kulti, Raniganj and Jamuria were included within the jurisdiction of Asansol Municipal Corporation.

Demographics

As per the 2011 Census of India data Asansol Sadar subdivision, after bifurcation of Bardhaman district in 2017, had a total population of 1,672,659. There were 868,696 (51%) males and 803,963 (49%) females. Population below 6 years was 192,151.

As per the 2011 census data the total number of literates in Asansol subdivision, after bifurcation of Bardhaman district in 2017, was 1,147,851 (77.53% of the population over 6 years) out of which males numbered 649,034 (84.41% of the male population over 6 years) and females numbered 468,857 (65.85% of the female population over 6 years).

In the 2011 census Hindus numbered 1,352,185 and formed 80.84% of the population in Asansol subdivision. Muslims numbered 283,225 and formed 16.93% of the population. Christians numbered 9,478 and formed 0.57% of the population. Others numbered 2,771 and formed 1.66% of the population.

Police stations
Police stations in Asansol Sadar subdivision have the following features and jurisdiction:

Blocks
Community development blocks in Asansol Sadar subdivision are:

Gram panchayats
The subdivision contains 35 gram panchayats under 4 community development blocks:

 Barabani block consists of eight gram panchayats, viz. Baraboni, Itapara, Nuni, Panuria, Domohani, Jamgram, Panchgechhia and Punchrah.
 Jamuria block consists of ten gram panchayats, viz. Bahadurpur, Dobrana, Madantor, Tapsi, Chinchuria, Hijalgara, Parasia, Churulia, Kenda and Shyamla.
 Raniganj block consists of six gram panchayats, viz. Amrasota, Egra, Ratibati, Ballavpur, Jemeri and Tirat.
 Salanpur block consists of eleven gram panchayats, viz. Achhra, Dendua, Fulberia Bolkunda, Alladi, Ethora, Rupnarayanpur, Basudevpur Jemari, Jitpur–Uttarrampur, Salanpur, Kalya and Samdi.

Economy

Coal mining
Coalmining in India first started in the Raniganj Coalfield. In 1774, John Sumner and Suetonius Grant Heatly of the British East India Company found coal near Ethora, presently in Salanpur CD Block.

In 1973, the Government of India took over the management of all non-coking coal mines in the country and in 1975 Coal India was formed to manage the coking and non-coking coal mines.

In 2015–16, Eastern Coalfields, a subsidiary of Coal India, produced 40.209 million tonnes of raw coal. As of January 2017, it employed 64,433 persons.

Railways
Narayankuri ghat, on the Damodar, was used by Carr Tagore & Company for transporting coal to Kolkata by boat in the middle of the nineteenth century. Varying levels of water in the Damodar posed problems for transportation. In order to capture the lucrative coal transport business, East Indian Railway laid lines up to Raniganj in 1855. It captured the entire coal transport business. The line was extended to Asansol in 1863.

The Bardhaman-Asansol section, Asansol-Gaya section and Asansol-Patna section, of Eastern Railway, which are part of Howrah-Gaya-Delhi line, Howrah-Allahabad-Mumbai line and Howrah-Delhi main line, pass through this subdivision. The Andal-Jamuria-Sitarampur branch line also serves the coal mines. This subdivision connects to South Eastern Railway through the Asansol-Adra line.

Industry
IISCO Steel Plant of Steel Authority of India at Burnpur has a crude steel production capacity of 2.5 million tonnes per year. The modernisation and expansion programme of IISCO Steel Plant, implemented with an investment of over Rs 16,000 crore, was dedicated to the nation by Narendra Modi, Prime Minister, on 10 May 2015. As of 2015, the investment for modernization was the single largest investment in West Bengal till then. Established in 1918, the Indian Iron and Steel Company (IISCO) was amalgamated with SAIL in 2006 and renamed IISCO Steel Plant.

Chittaranjan Locomotive Works is one of the largest electric locomotive manufacturers in the world. Established in 1950, it produced steam locomotives up to 1972.

Ballavpur Paper Mnfg. Ltd. (earlier Bengal Paper Mill), after revamp of the plant at Ballavpur, started production in 2009. They produce kraft paper used for packaging.

Education
Given in the table below (data in numbers) is a comprehensive picture of the education scenario in Paschim Bardhaman district, after bifurcation of Bardhaman district in 2017, with data for the year 2013-14:

Note: Primary schools include junior basic schools; middle schools, high schools and higher secondary schools include madrasahs; technical schools include junior technical schools, junior government polytechnics, industrial technical institutes, industrial training centres, nursing training institutes etc.; technical and professional colleges include engineering colleges, medical colleges, para-medical institutes, management colleges, teachers training and nursing training colleges, law colleges, art colleges, music colleges etc. Special and non-formal education centres include sishu siksha kendras, madhyamik siksha kendras, centres of Rabindra mukta vidyalaya, recognised Sanskrit tols, institutions for the blind and other handicapped persons, Anganwadi centres, reformatory schools etc.

The following institutions are located in Asansol subdivision:
Kazi Nazrul University was established in 2012 at Asansol.
Asansol Engineering College was established in 1998 at Asansol. It is affiliated with the Maulana Abul Kalam Azad University of Technology.
Banwarilal Bhalotia College was established at Asanol in 1944. It is affiliated with the Kazi Nazrul University.
Asansol Girls' College was established at Asansol in 1950. It is affiliated with the Kazi Nazrul University.
Bidhan Chandra College was established in 1961 at Asansol. It is affiliated with the Kazi Nazrul University.
Kulti College was established in 1986 at Kulti. It is affiliated with the Kazi Nazrul University.
Kazi Nazrul Islam Mahavidyalaya was established in 1981 at Churulia. It is affiliated with Kazi Nazrul University.
Triveni Devi Bhalotia College was established in 1957 at Raniganj. It is affiliated with Kazi Nazrul University.
Raniganj Girls' College was established in 1980 at Raniganj. It is affiliated with Kazi Nazrul University.
Kanyapur Polytechnic, offering diploma level courses in engineering, was established in 1965 at Asansol.
Deshbandhu Mahavidyalaya was established at Chittaranjan in 1973. It is affiliated with the Kazi Nazrul University.

Healthcare
The table below (all data in numbers) presents an overview of the medical facilities available and patients treated in the hospitals, health centres and sub-centres in 2014 in Paschim Bardhaman district, after bifurcation of Bardhaman district in 2017, with data for the year 2013–14.

Medical facilities
Asansol subdivision has a subdivisional hospital at Asansol. There is a rural hospital at Ballavpur. The subdivision has block primary health centres at Pithaikuri, Kelejhora, Bahadurpur, Akalpur and Raniganj, and primary health centres at Dabar, Parbatpur, Domohani, Panuria, Nuni, Lalganj, Churulia, Chinchuria, Birkulti, Baktarnagar and Tirat. Other hospitals in Asansol subdivision include ECL Central Hospital at Kalla, Sanctoria Hospital at Dishergarh, ECL's Banshra Hospital at Banshra, ECL's Salanpur Hospital at Dendua, Divisional Railway Hospital at Asansol, ESI Hospital at Kanyapur, HLG Memorial Hospital at Kanyapur, Marwari Relief Society Hospital at Raniganj, Anandlok Hospital at Raniganj, Burnpur Hospital of SAIL at Burnpur. and Kasturba Gandhi Hospital of Chittaranjan Locomotive Works at Chittaranjan.

Further medical facilities in Asansol Sadar subdivision are as follows:

Hospitals: (Name, location, beds) 

Asansol Subdivisional Hospital, Asansol, 350 beds
Asansol Special Jail Hospital, Asansol, 20 beds
Dr. L. Sen Memorial Leprosy Hospital, Asansol, 50 beds
Divisional Railway Hospital, Asansol, 225 beds
ESI Hospital, Asansol, 150 beds
Burnpur Hospital, Burnpur, 550 beds
ECL Central Hospital, Kalla, 450 beds
ECL Sanctoria Hospital, Dishergarh, 250 beds
ECL Banshra Hospital, Banshra, PO Kalla, 50 beds
ECL Satgram Hospital, Satgram, 50 beds
KG Hospital, Chittaranjan, 150 beds
 Kulti Hospital, Kulti, 90 beds
Raniganj Leprosy Hospital, Ballavpur, 50 beds
Searsol TB Hospital, Searsol Rajbati, 50 beds

Rural Hospitals: (Name, CD block, location, beds) 

Ballabhpur Rural Hospital, Raniganj CD block, Ballavpur, 50 beds
Bahadurpur Rural Hospital, Jamuria CD block, Bahadurpur, 30 beds
Kelejora Rural Hospital, Barabani CD block, Domohani Bazar, 30 beds
Pithaikeary Rural Hospital, Salanpur CD block, Rupnarayanpur, 30 beds

Block Primary Health Centres: (Name, CD block, location, beds)

Raniganj Block Primary Health Centre, Raniganj CD block, Raniganj, 25 beds
Akalpur Block Primary Health Centre, Jamuria CD block, Akalpur, 10 beds

Primary Health Centres : (CD block-wise)(CD block, PHC location, beds)

Raniganj CD block: Baktarnagar (6), Tirat (PO Kalipahari) (6)
Jamuria CD block: Churulia Pramila Nazrul (Churulia) (6), Sirisdanga (PO Mandi) (6), Birkulti (2), Chinchuria (6)
Barabani CD block: Domohani (10), Lalganj (2), Nuni (6), Panuria (6)
Salanpur CD block: Dabor (PO Achra) (10), Parbotpur (PO Samdi) (2)
Asansol MC (earlier CD block areas): Barakar (15), Kumardiha (PO Sitarampur) (2), Sodepur (PO Sundar Chowk) (2), Marichkota (PO Ethora) (2), Dakshin Dhadka (10), Damra (PO Kalipahari) (2), Bidyanandapur (PO Surjanagara) (6), Dhenua (PO Hirapur) (2), Dihika (PO Surjanagar) (10).

Electoral constituencies
Lok Sabha (parliamentary) and Vidhan Sabha (state assembly) constituencies in Asansol subdivision were as follows:

References

External links
 
 

Subdivisions of West Bengal
Subdivisions in Paschim Bardhaman district